Jeffrey is a 1995 American gay romantic comedy film directed by Christopher Ashley. It is based on a play depicting the life and times of Richard Jeffrey by Paul Rudnick, who also wrote the screenplay. The film stars Steven Weber, Michael T. Weiss, Patrick Stewart, and Bryan Batt.

Plot
The story takes place in Manhattan during the height of the AIDS epidemic and revolves around the title character, Jeffrey (Steven Weber), a gay man who has sworn off sex because of the epidemic. It is not so much that Jeffrey is afraid of dying himself, but that he is afraid that he will fall in love with someone who is bound to die; thus, his celibacy is not only about sex, but also about relationships in general. Almost immediately thereafter, Jeffrey meets Steve (Michael T. Weiss), a hunky, charming HIV positive man. He experiences an emotional conflict as he must face his fear in order to accept love, often breaking the fourth wall to do so. With the help of friends, interior decorator Sterling (Patrick Stewart) and his partner Darius (Bryan Batt), as well as a cast of cameos – including Nathan Lane and Sigourney Weaver – he is able to overcome his fears and begin a relationship with Steve.

Cast
 Steven Weber as Jeffrey
 Michael T. Weiss as Steve Howard
 Patrick Stewart as Sterling
 Bryan Batt as Darius

Cameos
 Peter Jacobson as Jeffrey's hook-up #1
 K. Todd Freeman as Barney's waiter
 Robert Klein as Skip Winkley
 Christine Baranski as Ann Marwood Bartle
 Patrick Kerr as various
 Victor Garber as Tim
 Camryn Manheim as Single Woman
 Sigourney Weaver as Debra Moorehouse
 Kathy Najimy as Acolyte
 Ethan Phillips as Dave
 Thom Fitzgerald as Guy in Central Park
 Peter Maloney as Jeffrey's father
 Debra Monk as Jeffrey's mother
 Michele Pawk as Young Mother
 Nathan Lane as Father Dan
 Lenka Peterson as Church lady #2
 Olympia Dukakis as Mrs. Marcangelo
 Gregory Jbara as Angelique Marcangelo
 Kevin Nealon as news reporter (uncredited)
 Jimmy Somerville as pride attendee (uncredited)

Production
Filming took place from July 11 to August 14, 1994.

Critical reception
Reviews to Jeffrey were positive, as it holds a 70% rating on Rotten Tomatoes based on 30 reviews. Caryn James from The New York Times wrote  “For anyone who missed the play, the film offers a strong echo of its best qualities and a couple of truly hilarious moments.” Patrick Stewart got great acclaim for his supporting role, winning several critics awards, and even generated Oscars buzz, but failed to secure a nomination.

The film grossed $3.488 million at the domestic box office.

Home media
Jeffrey was released on VHS after its initial theatrical run, and on DVD in 2003. Shout! Factory released the film on Blu-ray in 2019.

References

External links 
 
 
 
 

References
 Jeffrey at MSN.com
 Jeffrey at LOGO
 Spanish-language page for Jeffrey
 Review by Roger Ebert
 On-set photos at GregoryJbara.com featuring Jbara, Weber, Dukakis, and Stewart

1995 films
1995 LGBT-related films
1995 romantic comedy films
American LGBT-related films
HIV/AIDS in American films
American independent films
American films based on plays
1995 directorial debut films
1995 independent films
LGBT-related romantic comedy films
Gay-related films
American romantic comedy films
Films with screenplays by Paul Rudnick
1990s English-language films
Films directed by Christopher Ashley
1990s American films